Frank R. "Josh" Billings (1904 – March 13, 1957) was an American jazz drummer. 

Born in Chicago, after moving to New York Billings performed and recorded with Jack Teagarden, Eddie Condon, and Red McKenzie in the Mound City Blue Blowers.

References

1904 births
1957 deaths
American jazz drummers
American male drummers
20th-century American drummers
20th-century American male musicians
American male jazz musicians